Nhlanhla Vilakazi (born 25 February 1987) is a South African professional footballer, who currently plays as either a left midfielder or left back for Premier Soccer League club Free State Stars.

Club career

Golden Arrows 
Nhlanhla Vilakazi signed with Golden Arrows on 1 July 2008, however he transferred to Bay United for an undisclosed amount in the following transfer window.

Bay United
Transferring to Bay United from Golden Arrows on 28 January 2009 for an undisclosed amount midway through the season, finishing the season, and playing in the 2009–10 season, he made a total of 6 appearances for the club. However the team did not fare well, and the end of the season would see Bay United relegated to the National First Division.

Ajax Cape Town
Vilakazi transferred once more on 1 July 2010, this time to Ajax Cape Town, where he is currently playing.
On 14 January 2013 Ajax Cape Town announced that Vilakazi had signed a pre-contract with Maritzbur United as he entered the last six months of his spell at the Cape outfit.

Maritzburg United
On 14 January 2013 Ajax Cape Town announced that Vilakazi had signed a pre-contract with Maritzburg United as he entered the last six months of his spell at the Cape outfit and the club decided against their option of extending his stay.

Free State Stars
In November 2015, Vilakazi joined Free State Stars.

AmaZulu
In March 2018 it was revealed that Vilakazi signed a pre-contract with AmaZulu F.C., and would be joining them in the 2018/2019 season.

Honours

Club
Ajax Cape Town
2010 Telkom Knockout: Finalist

AmaZulu
2018 Nedbank Cup: Winner

References

1987 births
Living people
People from the East Rand
Zulu people
South African soccer players
Lamontville Golden Arrows F.C. players
Cape Town Spurs F.C. players
Maritzburg United F.C. players
Free State Stars F.C. players
Bay United F.C. players
Association football wingers
Association football fullbacks
AmaZulu F.C. players
Sportspeople from Gauteng